Calappa japonica, also known as the Japanese shame-faced crab, is a marine species of box crab in the family Calappidae. Originally found in the waters around Japan, more recently it has been found in Africa, the Red Sea and Western Australia.

Description
Calappa japonica is a large crab, and has a yellow and red colouration. The length of carapace is approximately .65 times the width, with a tuberculated surface. Seven sharp teeth are located around the margins of each clypeiform expansion.

Distribution and habitat
This species was first discovered in Tokyo Bay, Japan.

Behaviour and diet
This crab is a predator, and feeds on invertebrates such as other crabs, as well as oysters and snails. It has a specially adapted right pincer which it uses to break open snail's shells. There is a large accessory tooth located at the base of the hinged part of the claw located opposite a flat plate on the fixed part, and it uses these as a vice. After breaking open the shell, it uses its left pincer, which is sharper and longer than the right one, and better at picking out the soft tissues. When it is disturbed, it folds its chelae (pincers) in front of its face and retracts its walking legs, forming a compact, well-armoured box-like structure; this  defensive stance makes it appear to be embarrassed, and has led to its receiving the name, "shame-faced crab".

References

Calappoidea
Crustaceans of the Indian Ocean
Crustaceans of the Pacific Ocean
Crustaceans described in 1892
Taxa named by Arnold Edward Ortmann